Sofrito is a meat (lamb, beef, chicken) stew sautéed with potatoes, garlic, turmeric, and cardamom and simmered in a small volume of water or stock with an acidic agent (sour plum juice, vinegar, or lemon juice), or braised with all these ingredients without prior sautéing. The second method can also be used in cooking veal, calves' brains or fish. The method of cooking makes this dish more similar to Hungarian chicken paprikash or Moroccan tagine than to the Italian, Spanish, or Latin American sofrito.

It is mostly common to eat it with chicken, although other types of meat are sometimes also used.

It originated in Sephardi Jewish communities that were expelled from Spain, and was eaten traditionally by them in regions including the Balkans, the Levant, Turkey and the Maghreb.

Recipes for sofrito vary widely. Claudia Roden's recipe calls for sunflower oil, lemon juice, and small amounts of turmeric, white pepper, and cardamom and little else, differentiating it from other recipes that incorporate paprika, onions, and garlic, or different spice mixes like baharat. Roden's recipe may be more typical of Egyptian styles of sofrito, which are subtler, "with a bit of allspice and/or cardamom".

Today it is widely eaten in Israel.

See also
Sephardi Jewish cuisine
Israeli cuisine

References

Sephardi Jewish cuisine
Israeli cuisine
Meat stews
Chicken dishes